Cainiella is a genus of fungi in the family Sordariaceae.

The genus name of Cainiella is in honour of Roy Franklin Cain (1906 - 1998), a Canadian botanist and Professor in Toronto.

The genus was circumscribed by Emil Müller in Sydowia Vol.10 on page 120 in 1957.

References

External links

Sordariales